A norepinephrine–dopamine releasing agent (NDRA) is a type of drug which induces the release of norepinephrine (and epinephrine) and dopamine in the body and/or brain.

Examples of NDRAs include phenethylamine, tyramine, amphetamine, methamphetamine, lisdexamfetamine, cathinone, methcathinone, propylhexedrine, phenmetrazine, pemoline, 4-methylaminorex, and benzylpiperazine.

A closely related type of drug is a norepinephrine–dopamine reuptake inhibitor (NDRI).

See also
 Monoamine releasing agent

References

External links

 
TAAR1 agonists
VMAT inhibitors